Silver wattle is the common name of several plant species:
 Acacia sclerosperma
 Acacia dealbata
 Acacia lasiocalyx
 Acacia retinodes
 Acacia rivalis